This is a list of notable books about the politics of science that have their own articles on Wikipedia.

Environment
 Merchants of Doubt: How a Handful of Scientists Obscured the Truth on Issues from Tobacco Smoke to Global Warming (2010) by Naomi Oreskes and Erik M. Conway

Health
 Liberation by Oppression (2002) by Thomas Szasz
 Mad in America (2002) by Robert Whitaker
 Big Pharma: How the World's Biggest Drug Companies Control Illness (2006) by Jacky Law
Medical Apartheid (2007) by Harriet A. Washington
 Side Effects (2008) by Alison Bass
 Bad Science (2008) by Ben Goldacre
 Doubt is Their Product: How Industry's Assault on Science Threatens Your Health (2008) by David Michaels (epidemiologist)
 Anatomy of an Epidemic (2010) by Robert Whitaker
 Bad Pharma: How drug companies mislead doctors and harm patients (2012) by Ben Goldacre

Miscellaneous
 Bending Science (2008)
 Betrayers of the Truth: Fraud and Deceit in the Halls of Science   (1983)
 Plastic Fantastic: How the Biggest Fraud in Physics Shook the Scientific World (2009)
 Science, Money, and Politics: Political Triumph and Ethical Erosion   (2001)
 Science Under Siege: The Politicians' War on Nature and Truth   (1998)
 The Great Betrayal: Fraud In Science   (2004)
 The New Politics of Science   (1984)
 The Republican War on Science (2005)

 
Political bibliographies
Lists of publications in science